Noble County is the name of several counties in the United States:

Noble County, Indiana
Noble County, Ohio
Noble County, Oklahoma

See also
Nobles County, Minnesota